The following is a timeline of the history of the city of Guantánamo, Cuba.

19th century

 1741 - An English naval force landed here to attack Santiago.
 1822 - Town established.
 1856 - Ferrocarril de Guantánamo (railway) begins operating (approximate date).
 1899
 La Voz del Pueblo newspaper begins publication.
 Population: 7,137 city; 28,063 district; 327,715 province.

20th century

 1903 - U.S. military Guantanamo Bay Naval Base established near city.
 1907 - Population: 14,559 city; 43,300 municipality; 455,086 province.
 1919
 Teatro Fausto built.
 Population: 68,883.
 1955 - Local MR-26-7 political group active.
 1957 - Teatro Luisa opens.
 1964 - Population: 122,400.
 1998 - Roman Catholic Diocese of Guantánamo-Baracoa established.
 1999 - Population: 208,030 city; 512,300 province.

21st century

 2002 - U.S. military Guantanamo Bay detention camp established near city.
 2014 - Population: 217,978.

See also
 Guantánamo history (in Spanish)
 Timeline of Guantánamo Bay — Spanish, Cuban, & American events.
 Timelines of other cities in Cuba: Camagüey, Cienfuegos, Havana, Holguín, Matanzas, Santiago de Cuba

References

This article incorporates information from the Spanish Wikipedia.

Bibliography

in English
 
 
in Spanish
 
 
 
  (fulltext)

External links

 Items related to Guantánamo, various dates (via Europeana)
 Items related to Guantánamo, various dates (via Digital Public Library of America)

Guantánamo
Guantanamo
Guantanamo
Guantanamo
Guantanamo